Heteroscodra maculata is an Old World species of tarantula which was first described in 1899 by Reginald Innes Pocock. This species native to West Africa and is found primarily in Togo and Ghana. This species has many common names, of which Togo starburst and ornamental baboon are most frequently encountered.

Description
These tarantulas can reach their full size after about 3 years. These spiders are characterized by their chalky white coloration with mottled black and brown markings. Notably, these tarantulas have very thick rear legs, leading many to believe that they are baboon spiders, however, they are not in the baboon spider subfamily of Harpactirinae.These tarantula are an "old world species" originating from Asia and Europe. Being an "old world species" these tarantulas have highly potent venom, and if keeping one as a pet its not recommend to handle.

Behavior
Heteroscodra maculata specimens are quite fast, defensive and possess potent venom. As these are old-world species, they do not possess urticating hairs, which further encourages them to bite as a primary defense. They are an arboreal species, though younger specimens have been noted to burrow during their first few months of life. Females tend to reproduce readily, though sexual cannibalism may occur. Egg sacs are reported to contain between 75 and 130 spiderlings.

References

External links
Tarantupedia

Theraphosidae
Spiders of Africa
Spiders described in 1899